Public Leadership Education Network (PLEN) is a nonprofit organization based in Washington, D.C. Its focus is to introduce college women and marginalized gender groups to role models, career paths, and skills trainings before they enter the workforce, to help prepare them for leadership roles in public service. PLEN's current Executive Director is Nancy Stalowski.

History
PLEN was founded in 1978 by Frances Farenthold, President of Wells College.  Farenthold brought her experiences as a Texas state legislator and candidate for governor to her new role as president of a women's college, proposing that women's colleges work together to educate women for public leadership.

With national recognition because her name was placed in nomination for the Vice Presidency at the Democratic National Convention in 1972 and her election as the founding president of the bi-partisan National Women's Political Caucus, Farenthold gained key support for her vision from Ruth Mandel who directed the Center for American Women and Politics and Betsey Wright who headed the National Women's Education Fund.  Ruth and Betsey worked with Farenthold to turn her idea into a successful proposal to the Carnegie Corporation of New York.  With this major foundation support, PLEN was established in 1978.  Programs aimed at preparing women students for leadership in the public arena were initially campus-based.

PLEN created its first Washington-based seminar in 1983 and moved its headquarters to Washington, DC in 1989 to expand its program offerings that bring women students to the Nation's Capital to learn from women leaders about the public policy process.

Programs
PLEN offers six annual seminars and a summer public policy internship program.
 Global Policy
 Law and Legal Advocacy
 STEM Policy
 Public Policy
 Women of Color Influencing Washington
 Looking Forward to the Future

Past programming 
Women & Congress: Students meet with female members of the House and Senate, members of their staff, advocates, and other leaders in government relations. Notable speakers include Congresswoman Eleanor Holmes Norton, Senator Mary Landrieu, Congresswoman Virginia Foxx and Congresswoman Judy Biggert. 

Women in Business Policy: Students meet with female members of the House and Senate, members of their staff, advocates, and other leaders in government relations. Notable speakers include Laura Lane President of Global Affairs at UPS, Director of Federal Government Affairs at the American Express Company Ellie Shaw, and others  

Women Unlocking Nonprofits: Students meet with female leaders from nonprofit organizations and advocates doing policy work in and around DC. Notable speakers include Director of Diversity & Inclusion at the Human Rights Campaign Nicole Cozier, Director of Advocacy and Legislative Affairs at Goodwill Laura Walling, and others.

Membership 
PLEN membership is open to all colleges, universities, and subsets within them such as political science departments, women's studies programs, women's centers, and career development centers. Membership fees are paid in the summer, which provides students with discounted prices throughout the academic year. Students from PLEN member institutions receive discounts on all PLEN seminars.

Member institutions

Bryn Mawr College, Bryn Mawr, PA
Chatham University, Pittsburgh, PA
College of Saint Benedict, St. Joseph, MN
Douglass Residential College (Rutgers University students included), New Brunswick, NJ
Luther College, Decorah, IA
Mount St. Mary’s University, Los Angeles, CA
Newcomb College Institute (Tulane University students included), New Orleans, LA | PLEN at Tulane
Scripps College, Claremont, CA
Smith College, Northampton, MA
St. Catherine University, St. Paul, MN
St. Lawrence University, Canton, NY
Texas Woman's University, Denton, TX
William Smith College, Hobart and William Smith Colleges, Geneva, NY

Associate members 

Augustana College, Rock Island, IL
Hood College, Frederick, MD

References

External links 
 
 PLEN's Women in the World Foundation Spotlight

Women's political advocacy groups in the United States